Miss Los Angeles Chinatown has been a 54 year old time honored tradition and one of the most anticipated events in Los Angeles. Every year the contest crowns a select group of accomplished young women from the greater Los Angeles area of California as cultural ambassadors to the community.  Every year the black tie gala garners an attendance of more than 500, including numerous notable public and business leaders. For the 2020 competition, in line with the changing times and modernizing what the Chinese Chamber of Commerce Los Angeles (CCCLA) stands for, CCCLA is reinventing the contest. In addition to adding a Mr. Chinatown competition, Miss Chinatown will be a contest to showcase the next generation of leaders in the Chinese American community, role models who embody principles of equality, integrity, and vision. The reigning court's duty will ultimately be to serve the community.

Aimed to empower the next generation of Chinese and Chinese Americans in Greater Los Angeles, the 2020 Miss and Mr. Chinatown contest will provide an important foundation for growth and success through mentorship, networking opportunities and professional development. The winners will join an extraordinary network of accomplished Miss Chinatowns who are leaders in their respective fields.

The current Miss LA Chinatown 2020 is Corrie Chan.

Overview 
The program is sponsored by the Chinese Chamber of Commerce of Los Angeles. Miss and Mr. Chinatown will be responsible to select an organization(s) that is related to the cause they want to benefit for their year of reign. Together with the support of the CCCLA, they will be responsible to design a brand calendar for the year of events they will personally lead the court to participate in, to support that organization in a direct and impactful manner. Miss and Mr. Chinatown will be responsible for launching an online blog hosted on the CCCLA website, where they can reflect on their charitable work, promote and educate the public about their cause, and rally support of the Chinese American community. Miss Chinatown and her court attend many events during the year, including the annual Golden Dragon New Year Parade.

History
The pageant was started in 1963. In addition to the queen, four princesses are chosen each year. In previous years, there were also a Miss Firecracker, Miss Personality, Miss Friendship, Miss Teen Chinatown, and Miss Chinese New Year.

Requirements
Eligibility of Applicants:

– Between the ages of 18 to 26 old on Pageant Date

– Single

– Education with High School Diploma or Equivalent Education (the California High School Proficiency Examination (CHSPE) and the
General Educational Development (GED)), or Above

– 25% Chinese ancestry

– Must be fluent in English

– U.S. citizen or U.S. permanent resident

– Resident of the Greater Los Angeles area

List of Miss Los Angeles Chinatown titleholders

Broadcast
The pageant was broadcast on KSCI (LA18), the local Public-access television cable TV channel.

See also
Miss Chinatown USA
Miss Chinese International
Miss Chinese Toronto
Miss Chinese Vancouver
Miss NY Chinese

References

External links
 MissLAChinatown.com Official website
 MissLAChinatown on twitter.com

Los Angeles
Beauty pageants in the United States
1960s establishments in California
American awards
Chinese-American culture in Los Angeles
Women in Los Angeles